W. Park was an association football coach of the 1940s.

In 1949, he coached the Australian national team for four games, all against Hajduk Split. The matches ended in one win and three losses for Australia.

References

Australia national soccer team managers
Year of birth missing
Year of death missing
Australian soccer coaches